The Royal Australian Historical Society, formerly Australian Historical Society, is a voluntary organisation founded in Sydney, Australia in 1901 with Andrew Houison as founding president. Its goals are to encourage the study of and interest in Australian history. It has a membership throughout Australia and many of its activities and facilities are funded by contributions from its members and benefactors.

The society is a constituent member of the Federation of Australian Historical Societies.

It publishes the biannual academic journal Journal of the Royal Australian Historical Society (JRAHS), which commenced as The Australian Historical Society Journal and Proceedings in 1901, which is the oldest historical journal in Australia, and a quarterly magazine called History: Magazine of the Royal Australian Historical Society.

Purpose 
The goals of the society are:
to encourage the study of Australian history and the preservation of Australian heritage
to promote the compilation of authentic records relating to Australia
to acquire, either by purchase, donation or otherwise, and preserve for the use of the society books, manuscripts, newspapers, prints, pictures and all such objects and materials (in any media) as may be considered by the Council to have a bearing on Australian history, and to establish, form, furnish and maintain a library
to promote interchange of information among members of the Society by lectures, readings, discussions, exhibitions of historical significance, tours, excursions and other appropriate means
to print, publish (in any media) and circulate such journals, periodicals, books and other literary or other undertakings as may seem conducive to any of the objects of the society

History
A public meeting in Sydney Town Hall on 30 October 1900 resulted in a resolution that an "Australian Historical Society" would be formed, in order to collect and preserve records, prints, photographs, books and other material relating to the history of Australia. The inaugural meeting of the Australian Historical Society on 15 March 1901 was attended by about ten people. The first president was Andrew Houison, and the first patron David Scott Mitchell (founder of the Mitchell Library).

Membership grew, and in 1918, the Society was granted the right to use the prefix "Royal".

The society's first premises, History House, opened at 8 Young Street, Sydney, in 1941, which remained its home until the move to the new (and current) History House at 133 Macquarie Street in 1971.

A. G. L. Shaw served on the Council of the RAHS during the 1950s and 1960s.

Activities
The society undertakes a range of activities including lectures and workshops, functions, walks, talks, and visits on a wide variety of topics in Australian history. It holds an annual conference which addresses current historical issues in local history and heritage. The society also has a research library with an extensive collection of pictorial and text resources on all aspects of the history of New South Wales. In addition it administers grant schemes on behalf of the New South Wales government for the promotion of heritage and the writing and publication of local history.

Publications
The Society's journal is the oldest historical journal in Australia.

The Sydney Morning Herald was an active supporter of the Society, and in December 1901 urged that the Society publish a journal, so that the work of the society could reach a wider audience. However, this was not taken up until March 1906, when the Journal and Proceedings, "Volume 1 1901 Part 1", was first published in March 1906 with the standardised library title of 
"Journal and proceedings (Australian Historical Society)". The first issue included a paper by Alfred Lee entitled "The Landing of Governor Phillip in Port Jackson". Volume 1 consisted of 12 parts which were published quarterly. Improvements in design and the addition of illustrations were introduced in Volumes II and IV (1917), and at the same time the editors announced a shift in editorial direction. Until then the journal had been publishing papers presented at the Society in the past, but from this point it was intended to publish more about the proceedings of the Society. This eventuated in the form of reports of excursions, answers to enquiries, and discussions about past published papers.

Between 1918 and 1964, after the society had adopted the "Royal" prefix, its standardised title became "Journal and proceedings / Royal Australian Historical Society". 
A. G. L. Shaw was editor of the journal from 1954 to 1964, the first professionally trained historian to edit it.

From the March issue of Volume 51 in 1965, the journal changed radically, increasing its size to about 400 pages, issued in four parts. At the same time it changed its name to Journal of the Royal Australian Historical Society (JRAHS). The journal was published quarterly until 1992, and since then has been published biannually. The peer-reviewed, biannual academic journal containing original, previously unpublished scholarly articles and book reviews and images.

Past issues under their respective titles (1901–June 1918 and 1918–1964) are available online as scanned copies, and the Journal is available as an electronic resource via Informit since 2012. An index of all journals between 1901 and 1985 exists on microform. The JRAHS has a Green Open Access policy, meaning that authors deposit a free copy of an electronic document online in order to provide open access to it. Its ISO 4 abbreviation is J. R. Aust. Hist. Soc..

The society also publishes the quarterly magazine, History, subtitled Magazine of the Royal Australian Historical Society. This grew from the society's newsletter, which began in March 1962 as a monthly supplement to the Journal and Proceedings. Its magazine format and name commenced in October 1988.

During the COVID-19 pandemic in Australia, the June editions of both publications were made temporarily available to the general public online.

Presidents 
The following persons have been president of the society:

 2022–present Iain Malcolm Stuart
 2021–2022 Carol Ann Liston
 2018–2021 Christine Isabel Yeats
 2014–2018 Carol Ann Liston
 2012–2014 Anne-Maree Harriet Cox Whitaker
 2011–2012 David Sulman Carment
 2003–2011 Robert Ian Jack
 2002 Carol Ann Liston
 1999–2001 Ruth Meredith Frappell
 1993–1998 Rosemary Diane Annable
 1988–1992 Carol Ann Liston
 1987 Robert Charles Lewis Irving
 1985–1986 John Michael Bennett
 1982–1984 Alice Hazel Kelso King
 1977–1981 Kenneth John Cable
 1970–1976 Rae Else-Mitchell
 1963–1969 Allan Ernest Bax
 1961–1962 Harold Arthur MacLeod Morgan
 1959–1960 Alexander Hugh Chisholm
 1954–1958 Charles Herbert Currey
 1953 Karl Reginald Cramp
 1950–1952 James Keith Solling Houison
 1948–1949 George Mackaness
 1945–1947 Guy Drayson Blaxland
 1942–1944 Alfred Ernest Stephen
 1940–1941 John Alexander Ferguson
 1937–1939 Karl Reginald Cramp
 1934–1936 George Henry Abbott
 1931–1933 Owen Esmond Friend
 1930 Harold Francis Joseph Norrie
 1928–1929 Karl Reginald Cramp
 1926–1927 James Henry Watson
 1923–1925 Aubrey Halloran
 1922 John Alexander Ferguson
 1921 Karl Reginald Cramp
 1920 Reginald James Black
 1919 Stephen Henry Smith
 1918 Hugh Wright
 1917 William Albert Braylesford Greaves
 1916 Walter Scott Campbell
 1915 Charles Trimby Burfitt
 1914 Charles Henry Bertie
 1912–1913 Frank Walker
 1911 James Dalgarno
 1910 William Henry Hazell Yarrington
 1909 James Henry Watson
 1908 Andrew Houison
 1907 Joseph Henry Maiden
 1906 William James Günther
 1905 Joseph Henry Maiden
 1904 Arthur Ashworth Aspinall
 1903 William Henry Hazell Yarrington
 1902 Norman Selfe
 1901 Andrew Houison

Footnotes

References

Further reading

External links 
 

Organisations based in Australia with royal patronage
Historical societies of Australia
1901 establishments in Australia
History journals
Publications established in 1901
Biannual journals
History magazines
Magazines established in 1988
Quarterly magazines published in Australia
George Allen Mansfield buildings
Magazines published in Sydney